The Muamar family detention incident occurred very early on the morning of June 24, 2006, in the first arrests of Palestinians in the Gaza Strip by Israeli Defence Forces (IDF) since the Israeli disengagement from Gaza one year earlier, when IDF soldiers detained Osama and Mustafa Muamar. 

The raid began 03:30 local time (00:30 UTC). IDF troops entered the house of the Muamar family in the village of Umm al-Nasser, near the Rafah Camp, about one kilometer from the Israeli border. The soldiers detained Osama and Mustafa Muamar. According to their father Ali Muamar, "they blindfolded and handcuffed me and started beating me up with the butts of their rifles and kicking me". He claimed that the soldiers also confiscated his computer and left after about an hour. The two men were taken to Israel.

An Israeli spokesman confirmed the detentions, said that both men were members of the militant group Hamas intending to carry out imminent attacks on Israel and stated "These Palestinians were transferred to Israel where they will be questioned". A spokesman for Hamas confirmed that the brothers were sons of a member but denied that the men detained were involved in Hamas.

See also
2006 Gaza–Israel conflict

References

Gaza Strip
People of the Israeli–Palestinian conflict